Dzivarasekwa is a constituency of the National Assembly of the Parliament of Zimbabwe. It is located primarily in the Dzivarasekwa suburb in the western part of Harare and covers the traditional territory and land beyond Dzivarasekwa river commonly known as Dzivarasekwa Extension. It is home to Dzivarasekwa Barracks, which houses the Presidential Guard. It is currently represented by Edwin Mushoriwa of the Movement for Democratic Change Alliance.

References

Harare
Parliamentary constituencies in Zimbabwe